Balbín is a surname. Notable people with the surname include:

Adán Balbín (born 1986), Peruvian footballer
Bohuslav Balbín (1621–1688), Czech writer, historian, geographer, and Jesuit
Carla Toscano de Balbín (born 1977), Spanish politician
Ricardo Balbín (1904–1981), Argentine lawyer and politician